Faulkner County is located in the Central Arkansas region of the U.S. state of Arkansas. As of the 2020 census, the population was 123,498, making it the sixth most populous of Arkansas's 75 counties. The county seat and largest city is Conway. Faulkner County was created on April 12, 1873, one of nine counties formed during Reconstruction, and is named for Sandford C. Faulkner, better known as Sandy Faulkner, a popular figure in the state at the time.

Located at the intersection of the Ozarks and Arkansas River Valley, the county was sparsely populated for much of its early years. Largely a county of rural settlements, growth came slowly following the Civil War and Reconstruction. The college known today as University of Central Arkansas was established in 1907, but population continued to grow slowly. The growth of Little Rock and the construction of Interstate 40 have made Conway and other parts of Faulkner County into bedroom communities for the state capitol. Today Faulkner County is included in the Central Arkansas metro area, with Conway as a principal city.

History

Eponym
Faulkner County was formed from parts of Conway and Pulaski counties on April 12, 1873, and is named after Sandford C. Faulkner, a planter, raconteur, and fiddle player known for his popular mid-19th century folk song "Arkansas Traveler", the official historic song of the U.S. state of Arkansas since 1987.

Geography

Major highways
 Interstate 40
 U.S. Highway 64
 U.S. Highway 65
 Highway 25
 Highway 60
 Highway 89
 Highway 107

Adjacent counties
 Cleburne County (northeast)
 White County (east)
 Lonoke County (southeast)
 Pulaski County (south)
 Perry County (southwest)
 Conway County (west)
 Van Buren County (northwest)

Demographics

2020 census

As of the 2020 United States census, there were 123,498 people, 47,389 households, and 31,590 families residing in the county.

2000 census
As of the 2000 United States Census, there were 86,014 people, 31,882 households, and 22,444 families residing in the county. There were 34,546 housing units at an average density of 53 per square mile (21/km2). The racial makeup of the county was 88.33% White, 8.48% Black or African American, 0.52% Native American, 0.72% Asian, 0.03% Pacific Islander, 0.68% from other races, and 1.23% from two or more races.  1.75% of the population were Hispanic or Latino of any race.

There were 31,882 households, out of which 35.70% had children under the age of 18 living with them, 56.70% were married couples living together, 10.20% had a female householder with no husband present, and 29.60% were non-families. 22.50% of all households were made up of individuals, and 6.90% had someone living alone who was 65 years of age or older.  The average household size was 2.57 and the average family size was 3.04.

In the county, the population was spread out, with 25.60% under the age of 18, 15.30% from 18 to 24, 30.10% from 25 to 44, 19.50% from 45 to 64, and 9.50% who were 65 years of age or older.  The median age was 31 years. For every 100 females, there were 95.50 males.  For every 100 females age 18 and over, there were 92.30 males.

The median income for a household in the county was $38,204, and the median income for a family was $45,946. Males had a median income of $32,288 versus $24,428 for females. The per capita income for the county was $35,159.  About 7.90% of families and 12.50% of the population were below the poverty line, including 12.90% of those under age 18 and 12.00% of those age 65 or over.

Government
Over the past few election cycles Faulkner county has trended heavily towards the GOP. The last Democrat (as of 2020) to carry this county was Arkansas native Bill Clinton in 1996.

Education

Public education
Publicly funded education for elementary and secondary school students is provided by:

 Conway School District, which includes Conway High School, Conway
 Greenbrier School District, which includes Greenbrier High School, Greenbrier
 Guy–Perkins School District, which includes Guy–Perkins High School, Guy
 Mayflower School District, which includes Mayflower High School, Mayflower
 Mount Vernon–Enola School District, which includes Mount Vernon–Enola High School, Mount Vernon
 Vilonia School District, which includes Vilonia High School, Vilonia

Private education
Privately funded education for elementary and secondary school students is provided by:
 St. Joseph High School, Conway
 Conway Christian School (Conway, Arkansas)

Communities

Cities
 Conway
 Greenbrier
 Guy
 Holland
 Mayflower
 Quitman (mostly in Cleburne County)
 Vilonia

Towns
 Damascus (partly in Van Buren County)
 Enders
 Enola
 Mount Vernon
 Twin Groves
 Wooster

Townships

 Beaverfork
 Benedict (contains part of Conway)
 Benton (contains part of Quitman)
 Bristol
 Cadron (contains most of Conway and part of Mayflower)
 California (contains most of Guy, part of Twin Groves)
 Clifton (contains Wooster)
 Cypress (contains most of Vilonia)
 Danley (contains most of Mayflower)
 Eagle (contains part of Holland and Vilonia)
 East Fork
 Enola (contains most of Enola)
 Hardin (contains Greenbrier and part of Holland)
 Harve (contains most of Holland, part of Enola)
 Liberty
 Matthews
 Mountain
 Mount Vernon (contains Mount Vernon)
 Newton
 Palarm (contains part of Vilonia)
 Pine Mountain (contains part of Conway and Mayflower)
 Union (contains part of Twin Groves)
 Walker (contains most of Twin Groves, part of Damascus and Guy)
 Wilson, includes Cato, Arkansas

Source:

See also
 Faulconer County
 List of lakes in Faulkner County, Arkansas
 National Register of Historic Places listings in Faulkner County, Arkansas
 David J. Sanders, state senator who represents part of Faulkner County
 David Meeks and Stephen Meeks, Republican brothers from Faulkner County who represent Districts 70 and 67, respectively in the Arkansas House of Representatives

References

External links
 

 
1873 establishments in Arkansas
Little Rock–North Little Rock–Conway metropolitan area
Populated places established in 1873
Sandford C. Faulkner